The Frescobaldi are a prominent Florentine noble family that have been involved in the political, social, and economic history of Tuscany since the Middle Ages. Originating in the Val di Pesa in the Chianti, they appear holding important posts in Florence in the twelfth century.

Early history
From an early economic base in the Italian community of cloth merchants in Bruges, the Frescobaldi expanded their banking interests to their home city of Florence in the 13th century. Their power base in the city's affairs lay in their participation in the small network that controlled the great cloth-working Arti: the Arte della Lana, the Arte di Calimala, the guild of cloth finishers and merchants in foreign cloth, and the Cambio, or money exchange. In Florence the Frescobaldi found themselves on the wrong side in the attempted power coup of the Grandi in 1343 and were henceforth barred from public service in the Republic, but the Frescobaldi remained prominent in the lesser offices still open to them, such as podestà in the small towns governed from Florence, and through the web of marriage connections among the Florentine ruling class.

As bankers, the Frescobaldi financed ventures for numerous members of European royal families, notably their financial conquest of  England, which Fernand Braudel has signalled as the greatest achievement of the Florentine firms, "not only in holding the purse-strings of the kings of England, but also in controlling sales of English wool which was vital to continental workshops and in particular to the Arte della Lana of Florence." In the 1270s the Frescobaldi opened an office in London and began financing the wars of King Edward I, eventually supplanting the pioneering Riccardi of Lucca, who were driven to bankruptcy by unpaid loans made to Edward. The Frescobaldi were receivers of the customs of England from 1307,  and also served as papal tax gatherers in England, helping to finance the Crusades. With the king's death in 1307, leaving a debt to all creditors that amounted to £30,000 Amedeo de' Frescobaldi continued in the favoured but dangerous position under Edward II; with the fall of Walter Langton, the royal treasurer, at the outset of the new reign, the bishop's debtors, many of them Italians, were instructed to render their debts to Frescobaldi; in 1309 he was granted all the wool customs from Ireland and Scotland. The barons' pressure against the influence of foreigners in the king's affairs, exemplified most prominently against the Gascon favourite, Piers Gaveston, swept up Frescobaldi, who at the time of the Ordinances of 1311 was ordered to tally up his accounts by October, and was arrested and all his goods seized. Frescobaldi fled England, first to Papal Avignon and then to Florence. The royal debt was never repaid, and together with other reverses in the economic downturn of the 14th century, led to the bankruptcy of the Frescobaldi.

A second Frescobaldi bankruptcy, in 1581, Braudel traces to the general movement of capital and trade to the North.

The family included several literary figures, including Dino Frescobaldi a poet (died c. 1316) and Leonardo Frescobaldi, who visited Egypt and the Holy Land in 1384 and wrote valuable historical accounts of the countries he visited, noting their customs, social life and economics.

Wine production
The Frescobaldi family began producing Tuscan wine in 1308 and soon developed a notable client base. In exchange for paintings, the Frescobaldis traded their wine with the Italian Renaissance painter Michelangelo. The family also supplied wine to Henry VIII; surviving contracts in the family archives are signed by the English king.

The agronomist Vittorio degli Albizzi of the House of Albizzi was an in-law of the Frescobaldi family through the marriage of his sister Leonida to Angiolo Frescobaldi; with Frescobaldi financing he was able to pioneer modern wine production techniques in Tuscany. In 1855, Albizi introduced Chardonnay, Cabernet and Merlot vines to the region.

The Frescobaldi family operates the wine producer Marchesi de' Frescobaldi and is behind the Laudemio brand of Italian olive oil.

Present day
The family is currently headed by Marchese Lamberto Frescobaldi (full name: Lamberto Frescobaldi Franceschi Marini), son of Vittorio Frescobaldi

Partnership with Mondavi
In 1995 the Marchesi de' Frescobaldi entered into a joint venture with Robert Mondavi Winery to produce  Tuscan wine. The joint venture produced several labels including Danzante, Luce della Vite, and the Wine Spectator "2001 Wine of the Year" Ornellaia. Following the acquisition of Mondavi by Constellation Brands in December 2004, the Frescobaldi family has been attempting to gain full control of the Tuscan ventures. In March 2005, the family was able to acquire control of Luce della Vite  and Ornellaia in April 2005.

Gorgona Project
The Gorgona project began in August 2012 thanks to the partnership between Frescobaldi and Gorgona, the only island penitentiary in Europe. Here, inmates spend the final years of their sentence, working and living in close contact with nature, while developing skills to support their return to society and the workforce.
In a small vineyard located in an amphitheatre-shaped area that overlooks the sea, the project aims to provide inmates with practical experience in the areas of grape cultivation and winemaking by working closely with Frescobaldi agronomists and oenologists. Today, the vineyard measures two hectares, including the original plot and a second area planted in 2015.

Tenute di Toscana
In May 2006, the Frescobaldi family merged their Tenuta dell'Ornellaia, Castel Giocondo and Luce della Vite wine holdings into a new venture partnership, Tenute di Toscana, with Stolichnaya Vodka and Michael Mondavi.

See also
History of Chianti
Gorgona Agricultural Penal Colony

References

Families of Florence
Italian noble families